Naria erosa, common name the gnawed or eroded cowry,  is a species of sea snail, a cowry, a marine gastropod mollusk in the family Cypraeidae, the cowries.

Subspecies
 Naria erosa chlorizans (Melvill, 1888)
 Naria erosa erosa (Linnaeus, 1758)

Description
The dorsum is yellow-ocher or pale brown, with many small white spots. The extremities of the shell show dark brown spots. A dark brown area which is roughly rectangular is present on each side close to the edge. The base is white to light beige, with thin transverse stripes.

At night in the living cowries, the extremely papillose brownish mantle usually covers the shell completely, camouflaging the animal.

Distribution
 This species and its subspecies occur in the Indian Ocean along the coasts of Aldabra, Chagos, the Comores, the East Coast of South Africa, Kenya, Madagascar, the Mascarene Basin, Mauritius, Mozambique, Réunion, the Seychelles, Somalia and Tanzania, as well in the Western Pacific Ocean (Malaysia, Australia, Philippines, Polynesia and Hawaii).

Habitat
Like most other cowries, during the day they usually hide under rocks slabs with the mantle drawn into the shell. They feed only at dawn or dusk.

References

 Lorenz, F. (2017). Cowries. A guide to the gastropod family Cypraeidae. Volume 1, Biology and systematics. Harxheim: ConchBooks. 644 pp.

External links
 Linnaeus, C. (1758). Systema Naturae per regna tria naturae, secundum classes, ordines, genera, species, cum characteribus, differentiis, synonymis, locis. Editio decima, reformata (10th revised edition), vol. 1: 824 pp. Laurentius Salvius: Holmiae
 Biolib
 Naria erosa chlorizans
 Naria erosa
 Cypraea erosa
 Erosaria erosa
 Malacos
 

Cypraeidae
Gastropods described in 1758
Taxa named by Carl Linnaeus